Western was one of the multi-member constituencies of the Althing, the national legislature of Iceland. The constituency was established in 1959 following the nationwide extension of proportional representation for elections to the Althing. It was abolished in 2003 when the constituency was merged into the Northwestern constituency following the re-organisation of constituencies across Iceland. Western was conterminous with the Western region.

Election results

Summary

(Excludes compensatory seats.)

Detailed

1999
Results of the 1999 parliamentary election held on 8 May 1999:

The following candidates were elected:
Gísli S. Einarsson (S), 2,191 votes; Guðjón Guðmundsson (D), 2,814 votes; Ingibjörg Pálmadóttir (B), 2,398 votes; Jóhann Ársælsson (S), 2,207 votes; and Sturla Böðvarsson (D), 2,802 votes.

1995
Results of the 1995 parliamentary election held on 8 April 1995:

The following candidates were elected:
Gísli S. Einarsson (A), 1,006 votes; Guðjón Guðmundsson (D), 2,596 votes; Ingibjörg Pálmadóttir (B), 2,924 votes; Magnús Stefánsson (B), 2,934 votes; and Sturla Böðvarsson (D), 2,593 votes.

1991
Results of the 1991 parliamentary election held on 20 April 1991:

The following candidates were elected:
Eiður Svanberg Guðnason (A), 1,228 votes; Guðjón Guðmundsson (D), 2,523 votes; Ingibjörg Pálmadóttir (B), 2,465 votes; Jóhann Ársælsson (G), 1,513 votes; and Sturla Böðvarsson (D), 2,523 votes.

1987
Results of the 1987 parliamentary election held on 25 April 1987:

The following candidates were elected:
Alexander Stefánsson (B), 2,219 votes; Danfríður Kristín Skarphéðinsdóttir (V), 925 votes; Eiður Svanberg Guðnason (A), 1,342 votes; Friðjón Þórðarson (D), 2,110 votes; Ingi Björn Albertsson (S), 935 votes; and Skúli Alexandersson (G), 956 votes.

1983
Results of the 1983 parliamentary election held on 23 April 1983:

The following candidates were elected:
Alexander Stefánsson (B), 2,367 votes; Davíð Aðalsteinsson (B), 2,130 votes; Eiður Svanberg Guðnason (A), 1,059 votes; Friðjón Þórðarson (D), 2,714 votes; Skúli Alexandersson (G), 1,187 votes; and Valdimar Indriðason (D), 2,452 votes.

1979
Results of the 1979 parliamentary election held on 2 and 3 December 1979:

The following candidates were elected:
Alexander Stefánsson (B), 2,806 votes; Davíð Aðalsteinsson (B), 2,531 votes; Eiður Svanberg Guðnason (A), 1,165 votes; Friðjón Þórðarson (D), 2,302 votes; Jósef H. Þorgeirsson (D), 2,061 votes; and Skúli Alexandersson (G), 1,201 votes.

1978
Results of the 1978 parliamentary election held on 25 June 1978:

The following candidates were elected:
Alexander Stefánsson (B), 1,763 votes; Bragi Níelsson (A), 1,546 votes; Eiður Svanberg Guðnason (A), 1,718 votes; Friðjón Þórðarson (D), 1,915 votes; Halldór Eggert Sigurðsson (B), 1,963 votes; Jónas Árnason (G), 1,470 votes; and Jósef H. Þorgeirsson (D), 1,721 votes.

1974
Results of the 1974 parliamentary election held on 30 June 1974:

The following candidates were elected:
Ásgeir Bjarnason (B), 2,525 votes; Benedikt Sigurðsson Gröndal (A), 771 votes; Friðjón Þórðarson (D), 2,125 votes; Halldór Eggert Sigurðsson (B), 2,272 votes; Jón Árnason (D), 2,368 votes; and Jónas Árnason (G), 1,178 votes.

1971
Results of the 1971 parliamentary election held on 13 June 1971:

The following candidates were elected:
Ásgeir Bjarnason (B), 2,481 votes; Benedikt Sigurðsson Gröndal (A), 723 votes; Friðjón Þórðarson (D), 1,734 votes; Halldór Eggert Sigurðsson (B), 2,233 votes; Jón Árnason (D), 1,928 votes; and Jónas Árnason (G), 931 votes.

1967
Results of the 1967 parliamentary election held on 11 June 1967:

The following candidates were elected:
Ásgeir Bjarnason (B), 2,381 votes; Benedikt Sigurðsson Gröndal (A), 977 votes; Friðjón Þórðarson (D), 1,867 votes; Halldór Eggert Sigurðsson (B), 2,141 votes; Jón Árnason (D), 2,076 votes; and Jónas Árnason (G), 827 votes.

1963
Results of the 1963 parliamentary election held on 9 June 1963:

The following candidates were elected:
Ásgeir Bjarnason (B), 2,363 votes; Benedikt Sigurðsson Gröndal (A), 912 votes; Halldór Eggert Sigurðsson (B), 2,125 votes; Jón Árnason (D), 1,814 votes; and Sigurður Ágústsson (D), 2,015 votes.

October 1959
Results of the October 1959 parliamentary election held on 25 and 26 October 1959:

The following candidates were elected:
Ásgeir Bjarnason (B), 2,234 votes; Benedikt Sigurðsson Gröndal (A), 926 votes; Halldór Eggert Sigurðsson (B), 2,011 votes; Jón Árnason (D), 1,894 votes; and Sigurður Ágústsson (D), 2,117 votes.

References

1959 establishments in Iceland
2003 disestablishments in Iceland
Constituencies established in 1959
Constituencies disestablished in 2003
Former Althing constituencies
Althing constituency